Bethesda Game Studios Austin LLC (formerly BattleCry Studios LLC) is an American video game developer based in Austin, Texas.

History 
BattleCry Studios was founded on October 3, 2012, as subsidiary of ZeniMax Media, headed by Rich Vogel as its president. Initially, it sought employees with experience in microtransactions and free-to-play games. By November 2013 the studio employed 35 people.

On May 28, 2014, BattleCry Studios announced their first game, BattleCry. On September 10, 2015, it was reported that the studio had laid off a "substantial portion" of its staff. On October 7, 2015, the development on BattleCry was halted for the studio to work on different projects. One of the studio's first projects following the hold of BattleCry was the modification and restructuring of Bethesda's Creation Engine (in conjunction with sister company id Software, utilizing netcode from Quake) to support multiplayer functionality in anticipation of then upcoming Fallout 76. In September 2017, Vogel announced that he had left BattleCry Studios in favor of Certain Affinity.

In March 2018, the studio was rebranded as Bethesda Game Studios Austin, making it the third studio under the Bethesda Game Studios banner within Bethesda Softworks.

Games developed

References

External links 
 

2012 establishments in Texas
American companies established in 2012
American corporate subsidiaries
Companies based in Austin, Texas
Video game companies based in Texas
Video game companies established in 2012
Video game development companies
ZeniMax Media